The Gorda Ridge (41°36'19.6"N 127°22'03.1"W), aka Gorda Ridges tectonic spreading center, is located roughly  off the northern coast of California and southern Oregon. The ridge is broken into three segments; the northern ridge, central ridge, and the southern ridge, which contains the Escanaba Trough.

Regional setting
The Gorda Ridge runs in a north-easterly direction, bounded at both ends by transform faults. At the southern end, the ridge meets the Mendocino transform fault, while the northern end butts against the Blanco transform fault. To its east is the Gorda Plate, which together with the Juan de Fuca Plate to its north, is what remains of the once-vast Farallon Plate. These two oceanic plates are currently moving east, subducting underneath the North American Plate in what is known as the Cascadia Subduction Zone. To the west and south of the ridge is the Pacific Plate, which is currently moving west diverging from the Gorda Plate. The divergence of the Pacific Plate and the Gorda Plate has led to the creation of the Gorda Ridge. On the Pacific Plate, roughly 50 km west of the northern portion of the ridge, sit eight seamounts (underwater volcanoes), known as the President Jackson Seamounts.

Geological history
Roughly 30 Mya the Farallon Plate subducted beneath the North American Plate, segmenting the Pacific Farallon Ridge. This subduction created new microplates and new ridges, including the Juan de Fuca Plate and Juan de Fuca Ridge. As the Juan de Fuca Plate continued to subduct underneath the North American Plate it also segmented, creating the Gorda Plate and Gorda Ridge.

Spreading rate
The Pacific Plate is moving in a northwest direction, creating a divergence with the Gorda Plate at a speed of 5 cm per year. The Juan de Fuca Plate (including the Gorda Plate) is moving east-northeast, subducting under the North America Plate at a much slower rate of 2.5–3 cm per year. Due to the ridge being segmented into three distinct parts, each section has its own spreading rate, caused by the slab-pull and ridge-push of the surrounding tectonic plates. The northern segment is the narrowest, with portions as narrow as 3 km across, and has the fastest spreading rate of 2.9 cm per year (half-rate). The central segment is roughly 10 km wide with a spreading rate of 2.4 cm per year (half-rate). The southern segment has sections as wide as 18 km, and has the slowest spreading rate of 1.2 cm per year (half-rate).

Seismicity
Due to the Gorda Ridge's proximity to the Mendocino Triple Junction, the area experiences a significant amount of seismic activity. The majority of activity is seen on the Gorda Plate, however some occurs on the ridge itself. Most events are generated by the divergence of the Pacific Plate and the Gorda Plate. Since 1983 there have been approximately 80 magnitude 3 earthquakes happening at this location every year.

1996 eruption
On 28 February 1996 the northern segment of the Gorda Ridge (42 40'N 126 48'W) experienced a burst of seismic activity, which lasted roughly three weeks. Concurrent with seismicity were a series of slow volcanic eruptions (1–10 m3/sec), forming thick flows of pillow basalt. These pillow basalts are thickest to the north, indicating this region's activity lasted longer than the other portions of the ridge. The estimated volume of erupted magma during this event is 18x106 m3, forming a blanket of new oceanic crust, averaging 75 m thick.

Axial Valley
Unlike other intermediate spreading centers, the Gorda Ridge has a large rift valley, which is typically seen in areas of slow spreading centers. This is caused by the oceanic crust beneath the ridge being thinner and mantle temperatures being cooler than most intermediate spreading centers. The Gorda Ridge has an average depth of 3000 m, with a few locations reaching depths of 3500 m. The walls of this valley are steep, in most cases giving a vertical relief of over 1000 m. The floor of the southern ridge valley has been filled in with roughly 1000 m of sediment from the continental margin, mostly delivered by turbidity currents. The central ridge valley contains exposed basalt, and the northern ridge valley has a light sediment covering.

See also
Divergent Boundary
Explorer Ridge
Juan de Fuca Ridge

References

Plate tectonics
Oregon Coast
Underwater ridges of the Pacific Ocean
Geologic provinces of California
Geology of Oregon